Šivetice is a village and municipality in Revúca District in the Banská Bystrica Region of Slovakia.

Šivetice used to be knowns for its ceramics. 

Monuments of Šivetice include a romanesque rotunda, a classicist lutheran church and the ruins of a small castle.

Rotunda 
On the hill over village stands romanesque rotunda of St. Margaret of Antioch from the 13th century, built from bricks. It's believed to be the biggest romanesque rotunda in Central Europe, as it have inner diameter 11 metres. Apart from religious function, it was also used as watchtower and refugium, as it is built on a small hill with great view of the valley. It contains unique romanesque and gothic frescoes. Currently  It is being reconstructed.

References

External links
Gotická cesta, profile of romanesque rotunda (English)

Villages and municipalities in Revúca District